The Wedding Guest is a 2018 British-American action-thriller film written and directed by Michael Winterbottom. It stars Dev Patel, Radhika Apte and Jim Sarbh.

It had its world premiere at the Toronto International Film Festival on September 8, 2018. It was released in the United States on March 1, 2019, by IFC Films.

Plot

Jay, a young British man, packs a stash of passports and arrives in Pakistan, travelling to Younganabad. Despite only speaking English, he carries out a careful plan by switching rental cars and buying equipment, including duct tape and two handguns. Scouting out a home where a wedding party are staying, he sneaks inside that night and kidnaps the bride, Samira, at gunpoint. Jay shoots dead an armed guard who attempts to intervene. He flees with Samira in the trunk of his car, disposing of the incriminating gun.

Jay offers Samira a choice: to return to her family and her arranged marriage, or continue on to Lahore and rejoin her boyfriend Deepesh, who hired Jay to rescue her for £15,000. Unwilling to be married, Samira chooses the latter. They drive to Amritsar, where Deepesh fails to meet them as planned. Jay purchases phones and SIM cards and manages to reach Deepesh, who says that he will instead be in India the following day.

Crossing the border into Delhi with fake passports, Jay meets with Deepesh and demands his payment. Media attention on the kidnapping and the guard's death have changed Deepesh's mind, and he offers Jay a further £20,000 to abandon Samira back in Pakistan. Jay tells Samira, playing her a recording of the conversation. She insists on seeing Deepesh, and reveals their plan to live off of diamonds he has stolen from his family's business.

Meeting briefly in Jaipur, Deepesh gives Jay half of the money, promising to have the rest the next day. In the morning, he collects Jay and Samira to take them to a hotel, and refuses to stop the car when Samira asks to speak in private. Jay pulls his second pistol, forcing Deepesh to pull over on a deserted stretch of road and give him the remaining money. Arguing with Samira, Deepesh hits her, and Jay drags him out of the car at gunpoint. He warns Jay not to trust Samira, but Jay demands the diamonds, and beats Deepesh to death after he attacks Jay with a rock.

Unsure whether to trust each other, Jay and Samira agree to reach safety together, split the diamonds, and go their separate ways. She finds the diamonds hidden in Deepesh's shoe, and Jay burns the body. They check in to the hotel using Deepesh's passport, posing as tourists travelling to Nepal, and Samira sews the diamonds into the hem of her dress. Jay's contacts lead him to a fence who provides them with fake identities and puts them in touch with a buyer for the jewels. However, the jeweller refuses to handle the sale after appraising even one of the stones at over $100,000.

In Goa, Jay and Samira rent a house on the beach, and give in to their mutual attraction. Having grown close while on the run, Samira asks Jay for his real name; he replies “Aasif”, but she says she knows this is not true. In the night, she slips away with her fake documents and most of the money, and he awakens in the morning to find her gone. She calls to apologize, saying that while he can go home, she never can. Jay tells her to call if she ever needs anything, and Samira hangs up, riding a bus toward her new life while Jay sits alone.

Cast

Dev Patel as Jay
Radhika Apte as Samira
Jim Sarbh as Deepesh

In addition, Harish Khanna plays Nitin, who provides Jay with forged documents in Jaipur.

Production
In November 2017, it was announced Dev Patel had joined the cast of the film, with Michael Winterbottom directing from a screenplay he wrote.

Release
It had its world premiere at the Toronto International Film Festival on September 8, 2018. Shortly after, IFC Films acquired distribution rights to the film. It was released in the United States on March 1, 2019.

Reception
The website's critical consensus reads, "The Wedding Guest makes a compelling argument for Dev Patel as an actor worthy of diverse leading roles, even if the movie's less than the sum of its action thriller parts." On Metacritic, it has a weighted average score of 57 out of 100 based on 25 critics, indicating "mixed or average reviews".

References

External links
 
 

British action thriller films
American action thriller films
Films directed by Michael Winterbottom
2018 action thriller films
IFC Films films
Stage 6 Films films
Films set in Pakistan
Films set in Punjab, Pakistan
Films set in Lahore
Films set in India
Films set in Punjab, India
Films set in Amritsar
Films set in Delhi
Films set in Jaipur
Films set in Goa
Films shot in India
2010s English-language films
2010s American films
2010s British films